Adam Joseph Ladwig (born December 24, 1992) is an American professional baseball pitcher who is a free agent. He made his Major League Baseball (MLB) debut with the Miami Marlins in 2022.

Amateur career

Ladwig played high school at Millard West High School and college baseball for the Wichita State Shockers.

Professional career

Ladwig was first drafted by the Philadelphia Phillies in the 45th round of the 2011 Major League Baseball Draft out of high school, but he did not sign with Philadelphia. Three years later, he was drafted by the Detroit Tigers in the 11th round 2014 Major League Baseball Draft and signed.

On May 17, 2022, Ladwig was released by the Tigers. Eleven days later, he was signed to a minor league contract by the Miami Marlins.

His contract was selected by the Marlins on August 13, 2022. He made his debut that day, allowing six runs in  innings against the Atlanta Braves. He was designated for assignment the next day. He elected free agency on November 10, 2022.

References

External links

Wichita State Shockers bio

1992 births
Living people
Baseball players from Nebraska
Connecticut Tigers players
Erie SeaWolves players
Gulf Coast Tigers players
Lakeland Flying Tigers players
Major League Baseball pitchers
Miami Marlins players
Pensacola Blue Wahoos players
Sportspeople from Omaha, Nebraska
Toledo Mud Hens players
West Michigan Whitecaps players
Wichita State Shockers baseball players